Nagalkuzhi is a village in the Sendurai taluk of Ariyalur district, Tamil Nadu, India. The village has a famous Sivan temple built in the 19th century.

Demographics 

As per the 2001 census, Nagalkuzhi had a total population of 3379 with 1655 males and 1724 females.

References 

Villages in Ariyalur district